The Nine Arches Bridge also called the Bridge in the Sky, is a viaduct bridge in Sri Lanka. It is one of the best examples of colonial-era railway construction in the country. 

It is located in Demodara, between Ella and Demodara railway stations. The surrounding area has seen a steady increase of tourism due to the bridge's architectural ingenuity and the profuse greenery in the nearby hillsides.

The construction of the bridge is generally attributed to a local Ceylonese builder, P. K. Appuhami, in consultation with British engineers. The chief designer and project manager of the 'upcountry railway line of Ceylon' project was D. J. Wimalasurendra, a distinguished Ceylonese engineer and inventor. The designer of the viaduct was Harold Cuthbert Marwood of Railway Construction Department of Ceylon Government Railway. The 1923 report titled "Construction of a Concrete Railway Viaduct in Ceylon" published by the Engineering Association of Ceylon has details of all the records including the plans and drawings.  

Popular rumours suggest that when construction work commenced on the bridge, the Great War began between the empires of Europe and the steel assigned for this site was reallocated to Britain's War related projects at the battlefront. As a result, the work came to a standstill, leading the locals to build the bridge with stone bricks and cement, but without steel.

References

External links 
 In the Hills of Sri Lanka’s Tea Country

Bridges in Badulla District
Tourist attractions in Badulla District